A list of films produced in Italy in 1974 (see 1974 in film):

Notes

Footnotes

References

External links
Italian films of 1974 at the Internet Movie Database
Filmografia di Liliana Cavani

1974
Films
Italian